The tawny-winged woodcreeper (Dendrocincla anabatina) is a species of bird in the subfamily Dendrocolaptinae, the New World woodcreepers. It is found in Belize, Costa Rica, Guatemala, Honduras, Mexico, Nicaragua, and Panama. Its natural habitat is subtropical or tropical moist lowland forests.

References

Further reading

External links
Tawny-winged Woodcreeper photo gallery VIREO Photo-High Res
Photo-Medium Res; Article mbr-pwrc.usgs.gov–Mexico Birds

tawny-winged woodcreeper
Birds of Central America
Birds of Mexico
Birds of Belize
Birds of Guatemala
Birds of Honduras
Birds of Nicaragua
Birds of Costa Rica
Birds of the Yucatán Peninsula
tawny-winged woodcreeper
tawny-winged woodcreeper
Taxonomy articles created by Polbot